Cupido decolorata, the Eastern short-tailed blue,  is a small butterfly found in the Palearctic (Albania, Austria, Bulgaria, Hungary, Greece, Spain, Romania, Slovakia and the Soviet Union - the European part, the Czech Republic, Yugoslavia, Russian Federation) that belongs to the lycaenids or blues family.

Description
It is a small butterfly with a sexual dimorphism, the upperside of the male is dull blue bordered with grey, that of the female is brown, both with a white fringe. The underside is pale grey a little suffused with blue and decorated with lines of small black dots.

Biology
The larva on  feeds on Medicago sativa,  Medicago lupulina

See also
List of butterflies of Russia

References

decolorata
Butterflies described in 1886